William Henry Francis Kenneth Horton (Brentford, Middlesex 25 April 1906 – Hove, Sussex 31 October 1986) was an English cricketer.

William Horton was educated at Stonyhurst for whom he represented the 1st XI. As a right-handed batsman, he represented Middlesex in two matches in 1927 and the Europeans in India in two matches between 1929/1930 and 1934/1935.

External links
 Cricinfo
 Cricket Archive

1906 births
1986 deaths
English cricketers
Middlesex cricketers
Europeans cricketers
People educated at Stonyhurst College